Mictis tenebrosa (Heteroptera: Coreidae) is a species of hemipteran bug found in East and South East Asia. In China both the nymphs and adults are known to be edible.

Description 
The species' colour is brown with very large hind legs.

References 

Coreidae
Insects described in 1787